Three ships of the French Navy have borne the name Sémillante ("shiny" or "sparkling"): 
 , a 20-gun  (1780–1787)
 , a 32-gun frigate, lead ship of her class
 , a 60-gun frigate (1841–1855)

References

French Navy ship names